Mount Calvary United Methodist Church is a Methodist church in Harlem Village, Manhattan, New York City at 116 Edgecombe Avenue and 140th Street. The congregation occupies the former Lutheran church building of The Evangelical Lutheran Church of the Atonement, which was established in 1896 and built in 1897 as a mission church of St. John's Evangelical Lutheran Church. When Atonement merged with the Lutheran Church of Our Saviour, Atonement's congregation moved into Our Saviour's building at 525 West 179th Street and then 580 West 187th Street.

References

External links
 Organ Website

United Methodist churches in New York City
Washington Heights, Manhattan
Churches in Manhattan
Churches completed in 1897
19th-century Lutheran churches in the United States
Former Lutheran churches in the United States